The World Hockey Association Hall of Fame is an independent organization dedicated to honoring the World Hockey Association (WHA), which operated from 1972 to 1979 as a major professional ice hockey league. Honourees were inducted in 2010 and 2012.

Officially partnered with the United States Hockey Hall of Fame, the WHA Hall of Fame permanent museum displays are located within the United States Hall of Fame museum in Eveleth, Minnesota, with touring displays made available to be viewed at select locations and for special events.

Ballots and voting
In 2009, the voting ballot, which had been reviewed by members of the Society for International Hockey Research and the president of the International Hockey Hall of Fame, was distributed to former WHA players and personnel, media members, and invited hockey notables. All WHA veterans were eligible for induction.

The inaugural members of the WHA Hall of Fame were announced in 2010, with 41 individual members, plus The Howe Family (Gordie, Marty, Mark, and Colleen Howe were inducted as a family), making up the initial group of inductees. Eight additional individual members were inducted in 2012. The Hall of Fame also includes ten individuals as "Legends of the Game" who are included in recognition of their "significant contributions or career start in the WHA".

List of members of the WHA Hall of Fame

Further reading

References

External links
The official website of the World Hockey Association Hall of Fame

Awards established in 2009
Ice hockey museums and halls of fame
Halls of fame in Minnesota
Hall of Fame
Museums in St. Louis County, Minnesota
2009 establishments in Minnesota